Clement Lawrence Shaver (known as Clem L. Shaver) was a West Virginia politician who was the Democratic National Committee Chairman from 1924 to 1928.  He was born in Marion County, West Virginia on January 22, 1867. 
He was the West Virginia Democratic state chair from 1913 to 1916 and from 1916 to 1920. In 1934 he was an unsuccessful candidate for the United States Senate.

References

1867 births
Democratic National Committee chairs
People from Marion County, West Virginia
West Virginia Democrats
Year of death missing